I Don't Know Who Needs to Hear This... (stylized in all lowercase) is the second studio album by American singer-songwriter Tomberlin, released on Saddle Creek Records on April 29, 2022. It was recorded at Figure 8 Recording in Brooklyn.

The album's first single, "IDKWNTHT," which stands for "I Don't Know Who Needs to Hear This," was released on January 25, 2022. It features guest vocals from Felix Walworth. On February 16, 2022, the album was announced, along with the release of the second single, "Happy Accident," which features Cass McCombs on guitar. The third single, "Tap," was released on March 9, 2022, and the fourth single, "Sunstruck," was released on April 14, 2022.

The album was met with critical acclaim upon its release.

Track listing

Personnel

Musicians
 Sarah Beth Tomberlin - vocals, acoustic guitar
 Felix Walworth - bass, guitar, piano, drums, vocals
 Philip Weinrobe - bass, guitar, synths, piano
 David Cieri - piano
 Shahzad Ismaily - moog rogue, bass, guitar, percussion
 Stuart Bogie - woodwinds
 Doug Wieselman - woodwinds
 Aaron Roche - guitar, vocals
 Cass McCombs - guitar
 Jonnie Baker - moog, guitar
 Kenny Wollesen - percussion
 John Rossiter - guitar
 Jack McLoughlin - pedal steel
 Gyða Valtýsdóttir - cello

Technical
 Sarah Beth Tomberlin - production
 Philip Weinrobe - production, mixer, recording engineer
 Josh Bonati - mastering engineer

References 

2022 albums
Saddle Creek Records albums